David Nichol (25 August 1914 –  17 December 1995) was a Scottish first-class cricketer.

Nichol was born at Galashiels in August 1914 and was educated at Galashiels Academy. A club cricketer for Gala, Nichol was selected for the Scottish team to play Yorkshire at Glasgow in 1952, having originally not been a member of the squad for this match. Playing alongside his elder brother William, he took the wickets of Willie Watson and Johnny Wardle in the Yorkshire first innings for the cost of 61 runs. Batting twice in the match from the tail, he was dismissed for 4 runs in the Scotland first innings by Bill Holdsworth, while in their second innings he was dismissed for 2 runs by Ronald Wood. Nichol died at Melrose in December 1995. His younger brother, Robert, was also a first-class cricketer.

References

External links
 

1914 births
1995 deaths
People from Galashiels
People educated at Galashiels Academy
Scottish cricketers